Dompierre-sur-Nièvre (literally Dompierre on Nièvre) is a commune in the Nièvre department, region of Bourgogne-Franche-Comté, France.

Demographics
On 1 January 2019, the estimated population was 190.

See also
Communes of the Nièvre department

References

Communes of Nièvre